The 2020 Liga 3 South Sulawesi would be the fifth editions of Liga 3 (formerly known as Liga Nusantara) as a qualifying round for the national round of 2020 Liga 3. But cancelled due to the COVID-19 pandemic in Indonesia.

Perspin Pinrang were the defending champion.

Teams
There are 17 teams participated in the league this season.

References

2020 in Indonesian football
Sport in South Sulawesi